Nyctosyles is a genus of beetles in the family Carabidae, containing the following species:

 Nyctosyles laticollis Putzeys, 1866
 Nyctosyles planicollis (Reiche, 1842)
 Nyctosyles quadraticollis (Reiche, 1842)

References

Scaritinae